Miss America 1991, the 64th Miss America pageant, was held at the Boardwalk Hall in Atlantic City, New Jersey on Saturday, September 8, 1990 on NBC Network.

Results

Placements

Order of announcements

Top 10

Awards

Preliminary awards

Non-finalist awards

Quality of Life awards

Fruit of the Loom Award

Delegates

Judges
Delta Burke
John Forsythe
Shirley Jones
Larry King
Sidney Sheldon
Cynthia Sikes
Nell Carter

References

External links
 Miss America official website

1991
1990 in the United States
1991 beauty pageants
1990 in New Jersey
September 1990 events in the United States
Events in Atlantic City, New Jersey